James C. Kirunda (1950 – 25 May 2020) was a Ugandan international football player and international football manager for the Uganda national football team.

He participated in five Africa Cup of Nations qualifying campaigns and captained Uganda in three of the finals tournaments.

He was manager of the national team between 1989 and 1996.

References

External links

1950 births
2020 deaths
Ugandan footballers
Uganda international footballers
1974 African Cup of Nations players
1976 African Cup of Nations players
1978 African Cup of Nations players
Ugandan football managers
Kampala Capital City Authority FC players
Association footballers not categorized by position